Argynnina cyrila, or Cyril's brown, is a butterfly of the family Nymphalidae. It is found in Australia in southern Queensland, New South Wales, South Australia and Victoria.

The wingspan is about 40 mm.

The larvae feed on various grasses.

References

Australian Insects

Satyrini
Butterflies described in 1914